Ian Smith (born 19 June 1938) is an Australian actor, television producer and screenwriter.

Smith appeared in roles for Crawford Productions, before working as a producer, screenwriter and actor on the cult series Prisoner and the soap opera Neighbours as Harold Bishop from 1987 when the series was taken over by Network Ten until 1991. He returned to the role in 1996 and continued as a series regular until 2009, with subsequent guest appearances in 2011, 2015 and 2022.

Biography

Career

Theatre

Smith started his professional acting career in 1959, and although better known for his later roles on television, started as a stage performer with The National Theatre, taking roles in productions including Merry Widow, Camelot, My Fair Lady, Fiddler on the Roof, Anthony and Elizabeth and numerous others.

Television

Smith started appearing in television roles in the late 1960s in guest roles in drama series such as the Crawford Productions police dramas Homicide, Division 4, Matlock Police and Bluey.

Smith, after having appeared in numerous guest parts, gained a regular role in long-running Australian television serial Bellbird, after this he made a guest appearance in serial The Box in 1975.

Prisoner

Having had guest parts in Grundy Production's series Glenview High and Chopper Squad, Smith concurrently worked behind the scenes with Grundys as the associate producer and script editor of cult serial Prisoner, however he also had a semi-regular role in the series as Head of the Corrections Department, Ted Douglas.

I'm a Celebrity

Smith featured in Series 11 of I'm a Celebrity... Get Me Out of Here! to set the camp-mates challenges. He did not join the camp-mates.

Neighbours

Smith became famous through his portrayal of bumbling Harold Bishop in the soap opera Neighbours from 1987 to 1991, and returning in 1996. He switched to recurring status from 2008 to 2009, becoming one of its longest serving characters after 2,132 episodes. For his portrayal of Harold, Smith received a nomination for a Gold Logie Award in 2009.

In December 2010, Ryan Moloney revealed to TV Week that Smith would be returning to Neighbours in 2011. Smith appeared for six weeks from May 2011. Smith returned to Neighbours in 2015, with former co-star Anne Charleston for the 30th anniversary. He also appeared in a documentary celebrating the anniversary titled Neighbours 30th: The Stars Reunite, which aired in Australia and the UK in March 2015.

In April 2018, Smith admitted that he should have left Neighbours sooner and admits he felt typecast.  Smith admitted "he wasn't aware he was becoming 'Harold from Neighbours while he was on the show" and joked that when he auditioned for other roles he would be told "Oh you were in Neighbours, you were Harold, you couldn't possibly be a murdering paedophile".

In February 2022, Laura-Jayne Tyler of Inside Soap reported that Smith would be reprising his role to play a part in the show's finale. Smith has filmed a part in the upcoming film titled "Residence, playing Mike the Thaumaturge.

Personal life

Smith was 54 when his mother Connie Smith, realising she had very little time to live, told him that he had been adopted. After her death, Smith went in search of his natural mother Peg Kline, whom he finally found. According to Kline's story, Smith was conceived when she was fourteen, the product of rape, and was put up for adoption. Kline eventually married and had two children from this marriage. She never told anyone besides her husband about her first son until she was contacted by Smith via a letter. Kline contacted Smith's wife Gail, who mentioned that her husband was a prominent Neighbours actor, to which Kline replied, "I've never seen Neighbours in my life". Smith and Kline were reunited and he built a strong relationship with his mother and two half-brothers, although Smith said that he did not feel a mother–son relationship. He called Kline "one of my best friends". Kline died in May 2005 after a battle with cancer. Smith told his story in an exclusive interview on the biographical documentary series Australian Story'' in March 2005. He had also described the situation in a BBC interview some years before.

Although Smith was brought up as a Roman Catholic, in a 2008 interview, he identified as an atheist.

Filmography

References

External links
 
 Ian Smith as Harold Bishop
 Ian Smith in Panto at Grand Opera House York

Male actors from Melbourne
Australian adoptees
Australian male film actors
Australian male soap opera actors
Australian television writers
Australian atheists
Former Roman Catholics
1938 births
Living people
Australian male television writers
20th-century Australian male actors
21st-century Australian male actors